Square Dance (television broadcast title: Home Is Where the Heart Is) is a 1987 American coming-of-age drama film directed by Daniel Petrie from a screenplay by Alan Hines, based on his novel of the same name. The film stars Jason Robards, Jane Alexander, Winona Ryder, and Rob Lowe, and was released on February 20, 1987, by Island Pictures. It earned Lowe his only Golden Globe Award nomination for a film role.

Plot

Gemma Dillard is a 13-year-old country girl who lives with her Grandpa Dillard on a farm in the Texas Panhandle. Gemma is visited by her mother, who lives in Fort Worth, with an offer to come stay with her in the city. Her mother (who had Gemma when she was still only a teenager) is now married with a job as a hair stylist and can provide for her.

Gemma at first experiences slight culture shock in regards to big city life, but soon comes to accept her new surroundings. She becomes acquainted with a man with an intellectual disability, 21-year-old Rory Torrance. They play together, hang out together, and imagine that they are married.

The story focuses on a series of bittersweet experiences that eventually return Gemma to the country.

Cast

Reception
Square Dance received mixed reviews from critics and was a box office bomb. However, Lowe was nominated for the Golden Globe Award for Best Supporting Actor – Motion Picture. Vincent Canby of The New York Times cited Lowe's performance as "arresting", while Rita Kempley of The Washington Post felt that Lowe's character of Rory was "played with extraordinary sweetness". Roger Ebert called it "a weary morality play that sinks under the weight of its good intentions."

On April 17, 1988, the film aired on NBC under the title Home Is Where the Heart Is. One of the members of the Bayou Band as seen in the film was Trace Adkins who, in 1996, would have the first of more than 20 country hits.

References

External links
 
 
 
 

1987 films
1987 drama films
1980s coming-of-age drama films
1980s teen drama films
American coming-of-age drama films
American teen drama films
Films about intellectual disability
Films based on American novels
Films directed by Daniel Petrie
Films scored by Bruce Broughton
Films set in Fort Worth, Texas
Films shot in Fort Worth, Texas
NBC Productions films
1980s English-language films
1980s American films